Todd Boyce (born July 1, 1961) is an American film, television and theatre actor. He is perhaps best known for playing Stephen Reid in the successful soap opera Coronation Street from 1996 to 1997, 2007 and again from 2022.

Early life
Todd was born in Columbus, Ohio, the son of a business manager. Raised in New York, Germany, Chicago and Brazil, at age 16 he moved with his family to Australia.

He graduated from the National Institute of Dramatic Art (Sydney, Australia) in 1983.

Career
Todd Boyce graduated from Sydney Church of England Grammar School (S.C.E.G.S.) in December 1979 and joined the Australian soap opera The Restless Years in January 1980. He attended the National Institute of Dramatic Art (N.I.D.A.) the following year.  After graduating from NIDA he went on to star in the mini-series Fields of Fire.

Boyce debuted in Coronation Street as Audrey Roberts' illegitimate son Stephen Reid in 1996. He has appeared in 47 episodes of the series ranging between 1996 and 2007. He returned to the series on 24 June 2022.

Boyce stars in the E4 comedy drama Beaver Falls as Bobby Jefferson, Head of Camp. In January 2012 he made a guest appearance in the British drama "Sherlock". In August 2012, he made a guest appearance in Hollyoaks as Herb, and in 2013 he made a guest appearance in Mr Selfridge.

In 2016, he appeared in the Netflix series The Crown. His film credits include roles in I Can't Get Started (1985), The Punisher (1989), The Delinquents (1989) opposite Kylie Minogue, Blue Ice (1992), Jefferson in Paris (1995), Spy Game (2001), The Final Curtain (2002) and Flyboys (2006).

Filmography

Film

Television

Video games

References

External links

American expatriate male actors in the United Kingdom
American expatriates in England
American male film actors
American male television actors
American male voice actors
Male actors from Columbus, Ohio
1961 births
Living people